Valley Regional Hospital is a hospital located on 243 Elm Street in Claremont, New Hampshire, United States. It was established in 1893 as Cottage Hospital. As a 25-bed, 24/7-staffed emergency department hospital, it is the only such facility in Sullivan County. In a typical year 12,500 people will visit its emergency admission section.

In 2015, Valley Regional Hospital was rated as being in the top 25 of hospitals nationally on a set of composite quality and patient experience measures.

Starting 2015, the hospital began using green fuel, specifically 250,000 gallons per year of cellulosic ethanol.

References

External links
 Valley Regional Hospital website

Hospitals in New Hampshire
Buildings and structures in Claremont, New Hampshire
Cottage hospitals